Merivale may refer to:

 Merivale, Christchurch, suburb of Christchurch, New Zealand
 Merivale, Tauranga, suburb of Tauranga, New Zealand
 Merivale (company), Australian privately held company
 Merivale Road, Ottawa, Ontario, Canada

See also
 Merrivale (disambiguation)
 Merivale (surname)